Jessica Nicole Hische (born April 4, 1984) is an American lettering artist, illustrator, author, and type designer. She was one of the first of a new generation of letterers and the present-day flourishing of the lettering arts can in part be traced back to her emergence.

She published In Progress: See Inside a Lettering Artist's Sketchbook and Process, from Pencil to Vector in September 2015, which gives insight to her creative process and work she has completed as a hand-lettering artist. She has written and illustrated two New York Times best-selling children's books: Tomorrow I'll be Brave (2018) and Tomorrow I'll be Kind  (2019). She has spoken at over 100 conferences worldwide.

Background 
Hische was born in Charleston, South Carolina on April 4, 1984. She was primarily raised in Hazleton, Pennsylvania, graduating from Hazleton Area High School in 2002. She attended Tyler School of Art in Philadelphia, graduating in 2006 with a BFA in Graphic and Interactive Design.

Work 

After graduating in 2006, Hische worked for Headcase Design in Philadelphia, Pennsylvania. She moved to Brooklyn in early 2007 taking a position as Senior Designer at Louise Fili's studio, Louise Fili Ltd, where she worked until late 2009. Hische left Louise Fili Ltd to further her freelance career as a letterer, illustrator, and type designer, citing her appreciation for the balance between work and personal life. During her time in New York, she shared studios with other prominent artists and designers at The Pencil Factory and Studiomates in Brooklyn.

In 2012 Hische moved to the Bay Area and from 2012–2020 worked out of Title Case, a by-appointment-only collaborative studio in San Francisco, CA. Hische shared this studio with fellow letterer and designer, Erik Marinovich. In 2020 she relocated her studio to downtown Oakland in a space that operates as both her office and letterpress printing and laser-cutting workshop.

Hische contributes much of her early commercial success to her personal project, "Daily Drop Cap" along with other side projects including the Should I Work for Free flowchart and "Don't Fear the Internet", a tutorial website that teaches basic HTML and CSS to beginning web designers co-created with her husband Russ Maschmeyer.

Hische has been featured in many journals/magazines. She was named to the Forbes 30 Under 30 list, was listed in GD USA as a Person to Watch, and has been featured as a Print New Visual Artist. She was honored with the Young Gun award by the Art Directors Club of New York in 2009.

Hische has worked with clients such as Wes Anderson (designing the titles for his film Moonrise Kingdom), Dave Eggers (designing the book covers for his novels A Hologram for the King (2012) and The Circle (2013).), Penguin Books, The New York Times, Tiffany & Co., OXFAM America, McSweeney’s, American Express, Target, Victoria’s Secret, Chronicle Books, Nike, Samsung, Adobe, Apple, Barack Obama, Facebook, Harper Collins, Hershey's, Honda, Kellogg's, Macy's, UNICEF, NPR and Wired Magazine. She designed the packaging for comedian John Hodgman's comedy special John Hodgman: Ragnarok and designed the packaging for the Grammy-nominated vinyl release of Wyatt Cenac's comedy album Brooklyn.

Hische has designed or contributed to the design of several postage stamps. Together with Fili, Hische designed the "Love Ribbons" stamp for the US Postal Service, which ended up selling over 250 million stamps. She collaborated with Fili for two other stamp designs: Sealed with Love (2013), and Skywriting (2015). In 2015 she created her first solo stamp for the US Postal Service, a love stamp titled Forever Hearts.

Hische teaches workshops about lettering and creative business practices online and in-person at her studio. Several of these classes are available on the website Skillshare.

Personal 
Hische married Russ Maschmeyer in 2012. Their wedding invitation website, a parallax-scrolling timeline of their relationship designed by the couple and contributed to by Hische's former studio mates at The Pencil Factory, was featured by Gawker in an article titled "The World's Most Hipster Wedding Announcement May Justify Outlawing Love". Due to an outpouring of support by Hische's fans, the site issued a retraction the following day.

Hische and Maschmeyer have three children, Ramona Maschmeyer (b. 2015), Charlie Maschmeyer (b. 2017), and George Maschmeyer (b. 2019). They live in Oakland, California.

Influences
Hische counts designers Matthew Carter, Marian Bantjes, Chris Ware, Doyald Young, Ed Benguiat, and Alex Trochut among her heroes in type and lettering.

Typefaces
Though Hische predominantly works in lettering, she has produced a number of commercial and proprietary typefaces.

 Buttermilk™ (2009)
 Snowflake (2010)
 Brioche
 Minot (2013)
 Silencio Sans (2014)
 Tilda (2014) - the typeface Hische developed for the 2012 Wes Anderson film Moonrise Kingdom.

Sources
 Breuer, Gerda, Meer, Julia (ed): Women in Graphic Design, p. 475, Jovis, Berlin 2012
 Hische, Jessica and Fili, Louise (preface): In Progress: See Inside a Lettering Artist's Sketchbook and Process, from Pencil to Vector. Chronicle Books, 2015

References

External links 

Official site
Should I Work For Free
Daily Drop Caps

1984 births
American women illustrators
American illustrators
Living people
Artists from Charleston, South Carolina
Temple University Tyler School of Art alumni
American typographers and type designers
Women graphic designers
21st-century American women